The German Shepherd or Alsatian is a German breed of working dog of medium to large size. The breed was developed by Max von Stephanitz using various traditional German herding dogs from 1899.

It was originally bred as a herding dog, for herding sheep. It has since been used in many other types of work, including disability assistance, search-and-rescue, police work, and warfare. It is commonly kept as a companion dog, and according to the Fédération Cynologique Internationale had the second-highest number of annual registrations in 2013.

History 

During the 1890s, attempts were being made to standardise dog breeds. Dogs were being bred to preserve traits that assisted in their job of herding sheep and protecting their flocks from predators. In Germany this was practised within local communities, where shepherds selected and bred dogs. It was recognised that the breed had the necessary skills for herding sheep, such as intelligence, speed, strength and keen senses of smell. The results were dogs that were able to do such things, but that differed significantly, both in appearance and ability, from one locality to another.

To combat these differences, the Phylax Society was formed in 1891 with the intention of creating standardised development plans for native dog breeds in Germany. The society disbanded after only three years due to ongoing internal conflicts regarding the traits in dogs that the society should promote; some members believed dogs should be bred solely for working purposes, while others believed dogs should be bred also for appearance. While unsuccessful in their goal, the Phylax Society had inspired people to pursue standardising dog breeds independently.

With the rise of large, industrialised cities in Germany, the predator population began to decline, rendering sheepdogs unnecessary. At the same time, the awareness of sheepdogs as a versatile, intelligent class of canine began to rise. Max von Stephanitz, an ex-cavalry captain and former student of the Berlin Veterinary College, was an ex-member of the Phylax Society who firmly believed dogs should be bred for working. He admired the intelligence, strength and ability of Germany's native sheepdogs, but could not find any one single breed that satisfied him as the perfect working dog.

In 1899, von Stephanitz was attending a dog show when he was shown a dog named Hektor Linksrhein. Hektor was the product of few generations of selective breeding and completely fulfilled what von Stephanitz believed a working dog should be. He was pleased with the strength of the dog and was so taken by the animal's intelligence, loyalty, and beauty, that he purchased him immediately. After purchasing the dog he changed his name to Horand von Grafrath and von Stephanitz founded the Verein für Deutsche Schäferhunde (Society for German Shepherd Dogs). Horand was declared to be the first German Shepherd Dog, and was the first dog added to the society's breed register. In just a few decades of the 's establishment, the breed became one of the world's most popular and numerous, a position it has maintained to this day. By 1923, the  claimed 50,000 dues-paying members in more than 500 branches in Germany alone.

Horand became the center-point of the breeding programs and was bred with dogs belonging to other society members that displayed desirable traits and with dogs from Thuringia, Franconia, and Württemberg. Fathering many pups, Horand's most prolific was Hektor von Schwaben. Hektor was inbred with another of Horand's offspring and produced Heinz von Starkenburg, Beowulf, and Pilot, who later sired a total of 84 pups, mostly through being inbred with Hektor's other offspring. This inbreeding was deemed necessary in order to fix the traits being sought in the breed. Beowulf's progeny also were inbred and it is from these pups that all German Shepherds draw a genetic link. It is believed the society accomplished its goal mostly due to von Stephanitz's strong, uncompromising leadership and he is therefore credited with being the creator of the German Shepherd Dog.

During the first half of the twentieth century, the breed came to be strongly identified with Imperial and Nazi Germany, because of its association with purity and militarism. German Shepherds were coveted as "", being close to the wolf, and became very fashionable during the Nazi era. Adolf Hitler acquired a German Shepherd named "Prinz" in 1921, during his years of poverty, but he had been forced to lodge the dog elsewhere. However, she managed to escape and return to him. Hitler, who adored the loyalty and obedience of the dog, thereafter developed a great liking for the breed. Hitler kept several more of the breed, including Blondi, who was among several dogs in the 'Führerbunker' during the Battle of Berlin at the end of the Second World War. Dogs played a role in Nazi propaganda by portraying Hitler as an animal lover. Preparing for his suicide, Hitler ordered Dr. Werner Haase to test a cyanide capsule on Blondi, and the dog died as a result. Erna Flegel, a nurse who worked at the emergency casualty station in the Reich Chancellery stated in 2005 that Blondi's death had affected the people in the bunker more than Eva Braun's suicide. German Shepherds were also used widely as guard dogs at Nazi concentration camps during the Holocaust.

When the German Shepherd was introduced to the United States it was initially a popular dog. But as the dogs' popularity grew, it became associated as a dangerous breed owned by gangsters and bootleggers. The reputation of the German Shepherds as a dangerous breed had grown to such an extent that it was briefly banned to import them in Australia in 1929. Potential legislation was even considered to require that all German shepherds in South Australia be sterilised.

Naming 

The breed was named , by von Stephanitz, literally translating to "German Shepherd Dog".

The direct translation of the name was adopted for use in the stud-book; however, at the end of the First World War, it was believed that the inclusion of the word "German" would harm the breed's popularity, due to the anti-German sentiment of the era. The breed was officially renamed by the UK Kennel Club to "Alsatian Wolf Dog", after the French region of Alsace bordering Germany.

Eventually, the appendage "wolf dog" was dropped, after numerous campaigns by breeders who were worried that becoming known as a wolf-dog hybrid would affect the breed's popularity and legality. The name Alsatian remained for five decades, until 1977, when successful campaigns by dog enthusiasts pressured the British kennel clubs to allow the breed to be registered again as German Shepherds. The word "Alsatian" once appeared in parentheses as part of the formal breed name of the American Kennel Club and was removed in 2010.

Description 

German Shepherds are medium to large-sized dogs. German Shepherds can reach sprinting speeds of up to 30 miles per hour.
The AKC official breed standard does not set a standard weight range. They have a domed forehead, a long square-cut muzzle with strong jaws and a black nose. The eyes are medium-sized and brown. The ears are large and stand erect, open at the front and parallel, but they often are pulled back during movement. A German Shepherd has a long neck, which is raised when excited and lowered when moving at a fast pace as well as stalking. The tail is bushy and reaches to the hock.

German Shepherds have a double coat which is close and dense with a thick undercoat. The coat is accepted in two variants: medium and long. The gene for long hair is recessive, and therefore the long-haired variety is rarer. Treatment of the long-haired variation differs across standards; it is accepted but does not compete against standard-coated dogs under the German and UK Kennel Clubs while it can compete with standard-coated dogs, but is considered a fault, in the American Kennel Club. The FCI accepted the long-haired type in 2010, listing it as the variety b, while the short-haired type is listed as the variety a.

Most commonly, German Shepherds are either tan/black or red/black. Most colour varieties have black masks and black body markings which can range from a classic "saddle" to an overall "blanket". Rarer colour variations include sable, pure-black, pure-white, liver, silver, blue, and panda varieties. The all-black and sable varieties are acceptable according to most standards; however, the blue and liver are considered to be serious faults and the all-white is grounds for instant disqualification from showing in conformation at All Breed and Specialty Shows.

Intelligence 

German Shepherds were bred specifically for their intelligence. In a list of breeds most likely to bark as watchdogs, Stanley Coren ranked the breed in second place. Coupled with their strength, this trait makes the breed desirable as police, guard and search and rescue dogs, as they are able to quickly learn various tasks and interpret instructions better than other breeds.

Temperament 

German Shepherds are moderately active dogs and are described in breed standards as self assured. The breed is marked by a willingness to learn and an eagerness to have a purpose. They are curious, which makes them excellent guard dogs and suitable for search missions. They can become overprotective of their family and territory, especially if not socialised correctly. They are not inclined to become immediate friends with strangers. German Shepherds are highly intelligent and obedient, as well as protective of their owners.

Aggression and biting 

A 2020 literature review in Plastic and Reconstructive Surgery found that from 1971 to 2018, of all pure breed dogs in the United States, the German Shepherd was responsible for the most bites severe enough to require hospital treatment.

While an Australian report from 1999 provides statistics showing that German Shepherds are the breed third most likely to attack a person in some Australian locales, once their popularity is taken into account, the percentages of attacks by German Shepherds drops to 38th.

Modern breed 

The modern German Shepherd breed is criticised by experts for straying away from Max von Stephanitz's original ideology that German Shepherds should be bred primarily as working dogs and that breeding should be strictly controlled to eliminate defects quickly. He believed that, above all else, German Shepherds should be bred for intelligence and working ability.

Controversy 

The Kennel Club, in the United Kingdom, is involved in a dispute with German Shepherd breed clubs about the issue of soundness in the show strain of the breed. Some show strains have been bred with an extremely roached topline (back) that causes poor gait in the hind legs.

The issue was raised in the BBC documentary, Pedigree Dogs Exposed, which said that critics of the breed describe it as "half dog, half frog". An orthopaedic vet remarked on footage of dogs in a show ring that they were "not normal".

The Kennel Club's position is that "this issue of soundness is not a simple difference of opinion, it is the fundamental issue of the breed's essential conformation and movement." The Kennel Club has decided to retrain judges to penalise dogs with  these problems.

The Kennel Club also recommends testing for haemophilia and hip dysplasia, other common problems with the breed.

Variants

East-European Shepherd 

The East-European Shepherd is a variety of the German Shepherd bred in the former Soviet Union with the purpose of creating a larger, more cold-resistant version of the German Shepherd. It lacks the physical deformities bred into western show lines of German Shepherds and has become one of Russia's most popular dog types.

King Shepherd 

The King Shepherd is a variety of the German Shepherd bred in the United States, its breeders hoping to rectify the physical deformities that have been bred into the original breed.

Shiloh Shepherd 

The Shiloh Shepherd is a variety of the German Shepherd bred in the United States. It was developed in the 1970s and 1980s to correct behavioural and conformational issues that have been bred into modern German Shepherds, and was bred for its large size, length of back, temperament and soundness of hips. It has been recognised since 1990 by the American Rare Breed Association.

White Shepherd 

The White Shepherd is a variety of the German Shepherd bred in the United States. White-coated German Shepherds were once banned from registration in their native Germany, but in the United States and Canada the coloration gained a following and a breed club was formed specifically for white German Shepherds, calling their variety the White Shepherd. The variety is recognised as a separate breed by the United Kennel Club.

White Swiss Shepherd Dog 

The White Swiss Shepherd Dog is a variety of the German Shepherd bred in Switzerland. It descends from the American White Shepherds; the first stud dog of what was to become the breed was an American dog born in 1966 and imported to Switzerland. The variety was recognised by the Fédération Cynologique Internationale as a separate breed in 2003, and it is now recognised by a number of national kennel clubs.

Use as a working dog 

German Shepherds are a popular selection for use as working dogs. They are known for being easy to train and good for performing tasks and following instructions. They are especially well known for their police work, being used for tracking criminals, patrolling troubled areas and detection and holding of suspects. Additionally, thousands of German Shepherds have been used by the military. These military working dogs (MWD) are usually trained for scout duty, and they are used to warn soldiers to the presence of enemies or of booby traps or other hazards. German Shepherds have also been trained by military groups to parachute from aircraft or as anti-tank weapons. They were used in World War II as messenger dogs, rescue dogs and personal guard dogs. A number of these dogs were taken home by foreign servicemen, who were impressed by their intelligence.

The German Shepherd is one of the most widely used breeds in a wide variety of scent-work roles. These include search and rescue, cadaver searching, narcotics detection, explosives detection, accelerant detection and mine detection dog, among others. They are suited for these lines of work because of their keen sense of smell and their ability to work regardless of distractions.
At one time the German Shepherd was the breed chosen almost exclusively to be used as a guide dog for the visually impaired. When formal guide dog training began in Switzerland in the 1920s under the leadership of Dorothy Eustis, all of the dogs trained were German Shepherd females. An experiment in temperament testing of a group of Labrador Retrievers and German Shepherds showed that the Retrievers scored higher on average in emotional stability, ability to recover promptly from frightening situations, cooperative behaviour and friendliness; while the German Shepherds were superior in aggression and defensive behaviour. These results suggested that Labrador Retrievers were more suited to guide dog work while German Shepherds were more suited to police work.
Currently, Labradors and Golden Retrievers are more widely used for this work, although there are still German Shepherds being trained. In 2013, about 15% of the dogs trained by Guide Dogs of America were German Shepherds, while the remainder are Labrador Retrievers and Golden Retrievers. The Guide Dogs for the Blind Association in the United Kingdom trains some German Shepherds, while the comparable organisation in the US only trains Labrador Retrievers, Golden Retrievers and crosses between these breeds.

German Shepherds are still used for herding and tending sheep grazing in meadows next to gardens and crop fields. They are expected to patrol the boundaries to keep sheep from trespassing and damaging the crops. In Germany and other places these skills are tested in utility dog trials also known as Herdengebrauchshund (HGH) herding utility dog trials.

One Mexican German Shepherd, Zuyaqui, was dissected and his body put on display at the Sedena's "Narco Museum" in Mexico. He is regarded to be the dog who has captured the most drugs in Mexican police and military history.

Numbers 

When the UK Kennel accepted registrations in 1919, 54 German Shepherds were registered. By 1926 this number had grown to over 8000. The breed gained international recognition after the end of World War I. Returning soldiers spoke highly of the breed and animal actors Rin Tin Tin and Strongheart popularised the breed further. The first German Shepherd Dog registered in the United States was Queen of Switzerland. Her offspring had defects as the result of poor breeding, which caused the breed to decline in popularity during the late 1920s.

Popularity increased again after Sieger Pfeffer von Bern became the 1937 and 1938 Grand Victor in American Kennel club dog shows, only to have another decline at the conclusion of World War II, due to anti-German sentiment. Popularity increased gradually until 1993, when they became the third most popular breed in the United States. , the German Shepherd is the second most popular breed in the US. It is typically among the most frequently registered breeds in other countries. It was the third-most registered breed by the American Kennel Club in 2020, and seventh-most registered breed by The Kennel Club in the United Kingdom in 2016. Now in 2023 The German Sheperd is still ranked the second most popular dog in America.

Health 

Many common ailments of the German Shepherd are a result of the inbreeding practised early in the breed's life. One such common ailment is hip and elbow dysplasia which may cause the dog to experience pain later on in life and may cause arthritis. A study conducted by the University of Zurich found that 45% of the police working dogs were affected by degenerative spinal stenosis, although a small sample size was used. The Orthopedic Foundation for Animals found that 19.1% of German Shepherd are affected by hip dysplasia. There are, however, ways to help prevent hip dysplasia, including getting a pup from a good breeder, keeping it on a healthy diet, and limiting the amount of jumping or rough play. German Shepherds have low frequency of ear infections, since this breed is well known for hyperactivity of its cerumen-producing glands. According to a recent survey in the UK, the median life span of German Shepherds is 10.95 years, which is normal for a dog of their size.

Degenerative myelopathy, a neurological disease, occurs with enough regularity specifically in the breed to suggest that the breed is predisposed to it. A very inexpensive DNA saliva test is now available to screen for degenerative myelopathy. The test screens for the mutated gene that has been seen in dogs with degenerative myelopathy. A small study in the UK showed 16% of young asymptomatic German Shepherds to be homozygous for the mutation, with a further 38% being carriers. Now that a test is available the disease can be bred out of breeds with a high preponderance. The test is only recommended for predisposed breeds, but can be performed on DNA samples from any dog, collected through swabbing the inside of the animal's cheek with a sterile cotton swab. Prospective German Shepherd buyers can now request the test from the breeder or buy from a breeder who is known to test their dogs.

German Shepherds have a higher-than-normal incidence of Von Willebrand disease, a common inherited bleeding disorder, and exocrine pancreatic insufficiency (EPI), a degenerative disease of the pancreas. It is estimated that 1% of the UK population of German Shepherds has this disease. Treatment is usually provided in the form of pancreatic supplements taken with food.

Skeletal health and supplementation 

Musculoskeletal disorders are debilitating conditions that are often associated with genetic makeup, malnutrition, and stress-related events. Some breeds like the German Shepherd, are predisposed to a variety of different skeletal disorders, including but not limited to: canine hip dysplasia, Cauda equina syndrome, and osteoarthritis. These conditions can be a result of poor breeding or induced by intense exercise and poor diet.

Canine hip dysplasia (CHD) is an orthopaedic condition resulting from abnormal development of the hip joint and surrounding tissue causing the instability and partial dislocation of the hip joint, resulting in pain, inflammation, lameness, and potentially osteoarthritis of the joint. German Shepherds are genetically predisposed to CHD and the University of Veterinary Medicine in Germany found its prevalence estimated to be approximately 35% of veterinary cases associated with the disorder.

Osteoarthritis is one of the main contributors of musculoskeletal pain and disabilities that commonly affect German Shepherds. Mechanical stress, oxidative damage and inflammatory mediators combine to induce the gradual degeneration of the articular cartilage in the joint, resulting in reduced muscle mass, pain, and locomotion.

Feeding a well-balanced diet designed for large breeds like the German Shepherd to ensure adequate growth rates and proper maintenance of musculoskeletal health is essential. Dietary energy levels should be monitored and controlled throughout all life stages and activity levels of the German Shepherd to assist in the prevention and treatment of musculoskeletal disorder symptoms. Several dietary factors play a crucial role in maintaining skeletal health and are described as follows:

Appropriate calcium levels are vital in developing a strong skeletal system and aid in preventing orthopaedic diseases like Canine Hip Dysplasia. Furthermore, the ratio of calcium and phosphorus must be balanced and at a recommended ratio of 1.2:1 to ensure proper bone development and structure. Imbalances in calcium and phosphorus levels can result in various skeletal complications. Excess phosphorus can produce lesions in bones whereas excessive calcium can lead to hypocalcaemia and result in excess bone deposition, interfering with normal bone development. In extreme circumstances of insufficient calcium intake, bone resorption can occur due to the body withdrawing calcium deposits from the skeletal frame as a last resort to fulfill dietary needs.

Omega-3 fatty acids such as eicosapentaenoic acid (EPA) and docosahexaenoic acid (DHA), have been shown to be highly effective in the prevention of cartilage catabolism in in vitro models, suggesting that its supplementation in food could aid in decreasing the symptoms of osteoarthritis in German Shepherds. Furthermore, EPA and DHA inhibit key regulators of the inflammatory process and suppress their activation which can help alleviate pain and reduce inflamed joints associated with many skeletal disorders. Ensuring an appropriate ratio of omega-3 to omega-6 fatty acids of approximately 5:1 is very important for inflammation processes. Animals source, specifically marine life such as fish, krill, and mussels, and plant sources such as flaxseed, soybean and canola oil, are particularly rich in omega-3 fatty acids.

Glucosamine is an amino-monosaccharide that naturally occurs in all tissues, particularly in articular cartilage of joints and from the biosynthesis of glucose. Natural synthesis of glucosamine occurs in the extracellular matrix of articular cartilage in joints. However, as a result of damage to the joint or cartilage, there is decreased ability to synthesize glucosamine resulting in the deterioration of the joint, and supplementation is required. Clinical trials of long term administration of glucosamine in German Shepherds have reduced symptoms of degenerative joint disease and accelerated cartilage healing. Anti-inflammatory effects of glucosamine are believed to contribute to the reduction of pain, promote joint recovery and mobility, and prevent further cartilage degradation. Similarly, chondroitin supplementation is proposed to have comparable results in inhibiting degradative enzymes within the cartilage matrix to reduce the effects of osteoarthritis, but further research is required to assess long term benefits.

Vitamins such as A and D also have crucial roles in bone development and maintenance by regulating bone and calcium metabolism. Adequate levels should be incorporated into a German Shepherd diet to promote a healthy musculoskeletal system.

In popular culture 

German Shepherds have been featured in a wide range of media.
In 1921 Strongheart became one of the earliest canine film stars, and was followed in 1922 by Rin Tin Tin, who is considered the most famous German Shepherd. Both have stars on the Hollywood Walk of Fame.

Batman's dog Ace the Bat-Hound appeared in the Batman comic books, initially in 1955, through 1964. From 1964 onwards, his appearances have been sporadic.

A German Shepherd named Inspector Rex is the star of an Austrian Police procedural drama program of the same name, which won many awards, where German Shepherd Rex assists the Vienna Kriminalpolizei homicide unit. The show was aired in many languages.

 was a famous and very successful police dog in Hungary in the 1950s and early 1960s. A five-part thriller series for television titled Kántor was produced in 1975, which was loosely based on the actual dog's story, setting the events more than a decade after the real Kántor died. It became one of the staple productions of Hungarian television history, making German Shepherds the most popular dog breed in the country ever since. The taxidermy mount of Kántor's body is on display at the Police Museum in Budapest.

Notable individual German Shepherds 

 The dog on which the breed was founded
 Horand von Grafrath (January 1, 1895 – after 1899), considered the first German Shepherd and the genetic basis for modern German Shepherds
 In film, television and fiction
 Strongheart (1 October 1917 – 24 June 1929), featured in Hollywood films of 1921–1927
 Rin Tin Tin (September 1918 – 10 August 1932), Rin Tin Tin Jr., and Rin Tin Tin III, featured in Hollywood films of 1922–1947
 Thunder the Dog (7 September 1921 – after October 1928), featured in Hollywood films of 1923–1927
 Silver Streak (born 1924), featured in Hollywood films of 1924–1928
 Lightning, grandson of Strongheart, featured in Hollywood films of 1934–1938
 Ace the Wonder Dog, featured in Hollywood films and serials of 1938–1946
 Rex the Wonder Dog, fictional superhero in the DC Comics universe 1952–present
 Ace the Bat-Hound, fictional partner of Batman in DC Comics 1955–present
 Joe, protagonist in the NBC television series Run, Joe, Run in 1974–1975
 Won Ton Ton, protagonist of the 1976 comedy film Won Ton Ton, the Dog Who Saved Hollywood, a spoof of Rin Tin Tin
 Koton, sometimes identified as Rando, police dog later featured in the 1989 film K-9 with James Belushi
 Rex, protagonist of the Austrian-Italian comedy-drama television series Inspector Rex of 1994–2015, and remakes in other countries
 Pets of political figures
 Blondi (1941 – 29 April 1945), Hitler's pet on which he tested the cyanide capsules he later consumed to commit suicide, killing her
 Champ (11 November 2008 – 19 June 2021), Commander (born 1 September 2021), and Major (born 17 January 2018), pets of US President Joe Biden
 Major, police dog later kept as a pet of United States president Franklin D. Roosevelt while he was in office, which bit a United States senator and the Prime Minister of the United Kingdom in 1933 while living at the White House
 PDSA Dickin Medal recipients (for military and civil defence service dogs)
 Awards in the original 1943–1949 series for service in the Second World War
 Antis (1939–1953), 28 January 1949 for war service in North Africa and England and post-war assistance in an escape from communist Czechoslovakia
 Bing, a.k.a. Brian ( – October 1955), 29 March 1947 for service with the 13th (Lancashire) Parachute Battalion paratroopers
 Irma, 12 January 1945 for rescuing people trapped under destroyed buildings in civil defence service in the London Blitz
 Jet (21 July 1942 – 18 October 1949), 12 January 1945 for rescuing people trapped under destroyed buildings in civil defence service in the London Blitz
 Rex, April 1945 for locating casualties in thick smoke in burning buildings in civil service in England
 Rifleman Khan, 27 March 1945 for rescuing a drowning soldier in November 1944 in the Netherlands in the Battle of Walcheren Causeway, an engagement of the Battle of the Scheldt
 Thorn, 2 March 1945 for locating air-raid casualties in thick smoke in a burning building in civil service
 After revival of the medal in 2000
 Apollo ( – 2006), 5 March 2002 on behalf of all search and rescue dogs that served at the World Trade Center site and the Pentagon in the aftermath of the 11 September 2001 attacks in New York City, United States
 Lucca ( – 20 January 2018), 5 April 2016 for service with the United States Marine Corps of 2006–2012 in two tours in Iraq and one in Afghanistan for explosives and insurgent detection until injured by an IED
 Lucky (service ), 6 February 2007 for anti-insurgency service with the Royal Air Force against the Malayan National Liberation Army in the Malayan Emergency in 1949–1952 (the only surviving dog of a four-dog team)
 Sam (died 2000), 14 January 2003 for service in April 1998 in apprehending a gunman and in crowd control during protection of refugees in the Royal Army Veterinary Corps of the British Army in the Bosnia and Herzegovina conflict
 PDSA Gold Medal recipients (for non-military dogs)
 Ajax, 11 June 2013 for service in the civil guard that saved lives by detection of an ETA bomb near a guard barracks site on the Spanish island of Majorca in 2009 under dangerous circumstances
 Anya, 6 July 2010 for service as a British police dog in defending an officer from a knife attack in January 2008
 Ellie and Jones (Shepherd mixes), 22 August 2013 for saving their owner who collapsed and lost consciousness due to diabetic shock in November 2010
 Finn (born March 2009), 6 May 2018 for service as a police dog in a knife attack on a police officer in Stevenage, Hertfordshire, England, on 5 October 2016
 Gage (died 13 July 2010), 22 August 2013 (posthumously) for service as a police dog in a suburb of Christchurch, New Zealand, defending an officer in an attack by a man with a rifle (in which the dog was killed)
 Other military, police, search-and-rescue, and institutional guard dogs
 Gabi, 1980s guard dog at the Belgrade Zoo that protected a security guard and the public by fighting with an escaped jaguar
 , police dog in Hungary in the 1950s and early 1960s, later portrayed in fictionalized versions for novels and television
 Lex (1999 – March 25, 2012), used by the United States Marine Corps in Iraq and later adopted by the family of a soldier who died in a rocket attack while serving as his handler
 Mancs (1994–2006), earthquake search and rescue dog of Miskolc, Hungary, that helped rescue a 3-year-old girl who had spent 82 hours under ruins of a 1999 earthquake in Turkey
 Nemo A534 (died December 1972), served in battle in the United States Air Force during the Vietnam War
 Rajah, performing and unofficial police dog in New Zealand, suggested as a candidate replacement for Rin Tin Tin in films
 Trakr ( – April 2009), Canadian police dog that discovered the last survivor of the 11 September 2001 attacks in New York City, United States
 Zuyaqui (died 2000s), used by Mexican military and police forces for detection of illegal drugs

Notes

References

Citations

Bibliography 

 
 
 
 }
 
 
 
 }

Further reading

External links 

 Verein für Deutsche Schäferhunde e.V.—The original registrar of the German Shepherd
 

 
Dog breeds originating in Germany
FCI breeds
Herding dogs